Gorobilje is a village in the municipality of Požega, western Serbia. According to the 2002 census, the village has a population of 1506 people. There is a Serbian Orthodox Church of Saint John the Baptist in the village square.

References

Populated places in Zlatibor District